Guy Clinton McElroy (1946 – May 31, 1990) was an African American art historian and curator. Most notably, McElroy curated the major exhibition titled Facing History: The Black Image in American Art, 1710-1940. He died during the run of the show in 1990.

Career
Born to George and Geraldine Woods, McElroy was born and raised in Fairmont. He earned a Bachelor of Arts from the local Fairmont State College in 1970. McElroy then received two Master of Arts degrees: one from the University of Cincinnati in Art History in 1972, and another of Emerson College in Communications in 1975. At Cincinnati, he wrote a master's thesis on the artist Robert S. Duncanson, supervised by Gabriel P. Weisberg. While at Emerson, he wrote a thesis on the Roxbury Conglomerate and had a stint as a Rockefeller Fellow in Museum Studies at the Fine Arts Museums of San Francisco. Between 1976 and 1980, he pursued a Doctor of Philosophy in Art History from the University of California, Berkeley, but later transferred to the University of Maryland in 1983. McElroy did not complete the degree before his death in 1990.

McElroy began his curatorial career in 1972 as Assistant Curator at the Utah Museum of Fine Arts, and then in the same position at the Museum of African American History in Boston, starting in 1974. Four years later, he served as Curator of the Mary McLeod Bethune Council House National Historic Site, later being promoted to assistant director from 1982 to 1988. In 1986, McElroy was also hired as Adjunct Curator at the Brooklyn Museum. A year later, after an automobile accident in New Mexico, he became a quadriplegic and began using a wheelchair. McElroy continued to work there until 1989, and completed the major exhibition titled Facing History: The Black Image in American Art, 1710-1940, which toured in 1990 at the Corcoran Gallery of Art and the Brooklyn Museum. Unfortunately, he died as a result of pulmonary embolism while the exhibition was on view in Brooklyn. Before his death, he was slated to become assistant professor of art history at the University of Maryland.

The New York Public Library holds an archive of McElroy's papers, dating from 1969 until his death.

Works
Black Women Visual Artists in Washington, D.C., Bethune Museum-Archives, 1986
African-American Artists, 1880-1987: Selections from the Evans-Tibbs Collection, with Richard J. Powell and Sharon F. Patton, University of Washington Press, 1989
Facing History: The Black Image in American Art, 1710-1940, Bedford Arts, 1990

See also
List of Emerson College people
List of gay, lesbian or bisexual people: M
List of people with quadriplegia
List of University of Cincinnati people

References

External links
Dictionary of Art Historians profile
New York Times obituary

1946 births
1990 deaths
People from Fairmont, West Virginia
Fairmont State University alumni
University of Cincinnati alumni
Emerson College alumni
20th-century African-American writers
20th-century American historians
African-American historians
American art curators
American art historians
American gay writers
Brooklyn Museum
People with tetraplegia
Respiratory disease deaths in New York (state)
Deaths from pulmonary embolism